Nawab Jamia Mosque is a mosque in the town of Chengalpattuin Tamil Nadu, India. It is the most important mosque in the town.

Notes 

Mosques in Tamil Nadu
Buildings and structures in Kanchipuram district